The 2010 Kilkenny Senior Hurling Championship was the 116th staging of the Kilkenny Senior Hurling Championship since its establishment by the Kilkenny County Board in 1887. The championship began on 18 September 2010 and ended on 24 October 2010.

Ballyhale Shamrocks were the defending champions for the past four years, however their bid for five in a row was ended in the semi final by O’Loughlin Gaels, who went on to beat Carrickshock 0–17 to 1–11 in the final.

St. Lachtain's were relegated from the championship following 1–11 to 1–14 defeat to Fenians.

Team changes

To Championship

Promoted from the Kilkenny Intermediate Hurling Championship
 St. Lachtain's

From Championship

Relegated to the Kilkenny Intermediate Hurling Championship
 Young Irelands

Results

First round

Relegation play-off

Quarter-finals

Semi-finals

Final

Championship statistics

Top scorers

Top scorers overall

Top scorers in a single game

References

External links
2010 Kilkenny SHC results

Kilkenny Senior Hurling Championship
Kilkenny